Stacy Barthe (born July 19, 1985) is American songwriter, composer, and singer from Brooklyn, New York City.

Barthe began her career as a pop and urban marketing intern for Geffen and Jive Records. Following her internships, she connected with producer Hit-Boy on Myspace and moved to Atlanta in 2006 to work together. A year later, Barthe met Ethiopia Habtemariam, who signed Barthe to a publishing deal with Universal Music Publishing Group.

As a songwriter, Barthe has penned album tracks for artists including Beyoncé, Kelly Rowland, Heidi Montag, Britney Spears, Katy Perry, Brandy, Miley Cyrus, Alicia Keys, Nipsey Hussle, Tiwa Savage, and Rihanna. The song "Cheers (Drink to That)", co-written by Barthe and performed by Rihanna, charted at number seven on the Billboard Hot 100. High-profile producers Barthe has worked with include Malay, Cool and Dre, The Runners, Jerry Wonda, Supa Dups, Danja, Dapo Torimiro, and Tricky Stewart.

Barthe is also a Grammy-nominated songwriter for her contributions to Katy Perry's Teenage Dream, Rihanna's Loud, Miley Cyrus' Bangerz, Nipsey Hussle's Victory Lap, and Beyoncé's The Lion King: The Gift.

Barthe made her feature film debut where she played the role of the Black Madonna in the 2021 romantic drama Venus as a Boy, which was directed by Ty Hodges.

Career 

In December 2010, Barthe released  her debut extended play (EP), Sincerely Yours, Stacy Barthe. In November 2011, "Silent Night" by Brandy Norwood, which featured Barthe, was leaked online.

On March 12, 2015, French future house producer Tchami released the song "After Life" which featured Barthe's vocals. The song received over 8 million plays on SoundCloud as of April 2016.

In July 2015, Barthe's debut studio album BEcoming reached number 92 on the Billboard 200.

In August of 2016, Barthe was sighted working with singer-songwriter and actor J. W. Cudd.

Discography

Extended plays

Studio albums

Singles

As lead artist

As featured artist

Promotional singles

Guest appearances

Tours

Headlining 
 Bessie's 81 Theatre Tour (2015)

Opening act 
 The "All of Me" Tour (2012)

Awards and nominations

Grammy Awards

Soul Train Music Awards

Black Reel Awards

Songwriting credits

References

External links 
 
 

Living people
American musicians of Haitian descent
Musicians from Brooklyn
Singers from New York City
American contemporary R&B singers
American soul singers
Motown artists
American women pop singers
1985 births
21st-century American women singers
20th-century American women singers
20th-century American singers
Singer-songwriters from New York (state)